City vs Country is a Finnish primetime entertainment quiz show broadcast on MTV3. The show is hosted by two local hosts – one representing the city and the other one the countryside.

An international version of the show will be broadcast in autumn 2022 in Hungary by TV2. A version of the show aired previously in Lithuania on TV3. Other countries are interested in the idea of the format as well.

Format
Teams are family members, friends, co-workers or neighbours, always either from a big city or the countryside.

In the original Finnish version, in the first rounds, the teams answer to regular questions, either with multiple choice or not. From the first rounds, two teams from each side advance to semifinals, or "Duels". Here, the team with most correct answers will go to the final. In the final, the winning team choose on presenting them in the round. Then contestants haves to answer to questions fast as possible. If the contestant gets four or more correct in 90 seconds, the team wins the home country travel. If contestant can answer to eight correct, wins the team an Europe-travel, and if the contestant answers all 12 correct, they win a holiday trip to somewhere around the world.

Stadi vs. Lande

Season 1

Season 2

Season 3

Season 4

Season 5

International versions

References

Finnish game shows
2010s Finnish television series
Quiz shows